Berwick Sevens is an annual rugby sevens event held by Berwick RFC, in Berwick upon Tweed, England. The Berwick Sevens was the last of the Border Sevens tournaments to be instated, in 1983; but the first in England.

The main Borders Sevens tournaments combine in a Kings of the Sevens league; and the Berwick Sevens are now part of this league.

2019's Berwick Sevens was played on 21 April 2019. Watsonians won the final, beating Boroughmuir 24–17.

Invited Sides

Various sides have been invited to play in the Berwick Sevens tournament throughout the years. Stoke RFC made it to the final of the tournament in 1984, only to be beaten by Kelso.

Sponsorship

2019's Sevens tournament was sponsored by Kelso & Lothian Harvesters. 2018's tournament was sponsored by Sanderson McCreath and Edney; Berwick Solicitors.

Past winners

See also
 Berwick RFC
 Borders Sevens Circuit
 Scottish Rugby Union

References 

Rugby sevens competitions in Scotland
Rugby union in the Scottish Borders